Mohammad Qoli Khan Shamlu was a Turkoman nobleman from the Shamlu tribe, who briefly served as the Grand Vizier of the Safavid king (shah) Sultan Husayn (r. 1694–1722) from 1721 to 1722. He was succeeded by Fath-Ali Khan Qajar.

Sources 
 

Iranian Turkmen people
Grand viziers of the Safavid Empire
17th-century births
1722 deaths
Shamlu
18th-century people of Safavid Iran